Dipankar Datta (born 9 February 1965) is a Judge of Supreme Court of India. He is the former Chief Justice of Bombay High Court and the Judge of Calcutta High Court.

Early life and education
Datta was born in 1965 in a Bengali family. He came from a family with legal background. His father late Salil Kumar Datta,  was a former Judge of the Calcutta High Court. His brother in law Justice Amitava Roy, is a former Judge of the Supreme Court of India. Datta acquired his LL.B. degree from the Hazra Law College, University of Calcutta. He was in the first batch of 5 years Law course in the year 1989.

Career
After completing his LL.B. he was enrolled as an Advocate on 16 November 1989. He started practising at the High Court at Calcutta and worked as a state panel lawyer also. He also practised at the Supreme Court of India and other High Courts at other states in India. He has specialized in Constitutional matters and Civil cases. Datta was the Counsel for the Union of India since 1998. He had appeared on behalf of the School Education Department, University of Calcutta, West Bengal Board in Secondary Education and the West Bengal School Service Commission. He was the Junior Standing Counsel for the State of West Bengal from 16 May 2002 to 16 January 2004. Datta was a Guest Lecturer in the Hazra Law College from the year 1996–1997 to 1999–2000.

In High Courts
He was elevated to the Bench of the Calcutta High Court as a permanent Judge on 22 June 2006 and served there till April 2020.

On 23 April 2020, he was appointed as the Chief Justice of Bombay High Court and took oath on 28 April 2020.

In Supreme Court
On 12 December 2022, he was elevated as a Judge of the Supreme Court of India. He is due to retire on 8 February 2030.

References

1965 births
Living people
Indian judges
Judges of the Calcutta High Court
20th-century Indian judges
21st-century Indian lawyers
Chief Justices of the Bombay High Court
University of Calcutta alumni
Justices of the Supreme Court of India